The Thirteenth Tale (2006) by Diane Setterfield is a gothic suspense novel, the author's first published book.

Plot
Vida Winter, a famous novelist in England, has evaded journalists' questions about her past, refusing to answer their inquiries and spinning elaborate tales that they later discover to be false. Her entire life is a secret: and, for over fifty years, reporters and biographers have tried innumerable methods in an attempt to extract the truth from Winter. With her health quickly fading, Winter enlists Margaret Lea, a bookish amateur biographer, to hear her story and write her biography. With her own family secrets, Lea finds the process of unraveling the past for Winter bringing her to confront her own ghosts.

The novel opens as Lea returns to her apartment above her father's antiquarian bookshop and finds a hand-written letter from Winter. It requests her presence at the author's residence and offers the chance to write Winter's life story before she succumbs to a terminal illness. Lea is surprised by the proposal, as she is only vaguely aware of the famous author and has not read any of the dozens of novels penned by Winter.

While considering the offer, Lea's curiosity prompts her to read her father's rare copy of Winter's Thirteen Tales of Change and Desperation. She is unexpectedly spellbound by the stories and confused when she realises the book contains only twelve stories. Where is the thirteenth tale? Intrigued, Margaret agrees to meet with the ageing author—if only to discuss her reasons for not accepting the position as Winter's biographer.

During their meeting at Winter's home, Lea attempts to politely decline the offer and leave, but is stopped at the door by the pleas of the older woman. With promises of a ghost story involving twins, Winter desperately implores the bibliophile to reconsider. By the end of the encounter, Lea finds herself increasingly drawn to the story and proposes a conditional agreement to Winter; to earn the trust of her biographer, Vida Winter must supply her with three verifiable truths. Somewhat reluctantly, the three secrets are extracted from their keeper. Afterwards, Winter and Lea begin their adventure into the past with; "Once upon a time there were two little girls...".

As Vida Winter tells her story to Lea, she shares dark family secrets which have long been kept hidden. She recalls her days at Angelfield (the estate that was her childhood home), which has since burned and been abandoned. Recording Winter's account (the author allows no questions), Lea becomes completely immersed in the strange and troubling story. In the end, both women have to confront their pasts and the weight of family secrets, as well as the ghosts that haunt them.

Title
The title of the book is derived from a collection of short stories penned by Vida Winter entitled Thirteen Tales of Change and Desperation; the collection was supposed to contain a total of thirteen stories but was shortened to twelve at publication. Though its title was appropriately amended and its cover eventually reprinted to read simply Tales of Change and Desperation, a small number of books were printed with the original title and the twelve stories. This small press run became a collector's item (one of which Lea's father holds). Many of Winter's fans considered the omission of the thirteenth story a delightful mystery, and all wanted the answer to it. During the course of the story, Lea is asked more than once what she knows about the missing tale, and why it was never written. At the novel's conclusion, Lea receives the long-awaited thirteenth tale as a parting gift from Vida Winter.

Characters
Margaret Lea: a bookstore owner's daughter, whom Vida Winter asks to write her biography. The primary narrator of the book.
Vida Winter: a famous novelist who has eluded reporters as to her true past, and is now ready to reveal her secrets to Margaret. Formerly known as Adeline March (a secret used as one of the "three verifiable truths" that Miss Winter reveals to Margaret at the beginning of the story). Later revealed as the ghost and secret paternal younger half-sister to the twins. 
Isabelle Angelfield: the younger of George Angelfield's two children and the mother of twins Emmeline and Adeline.
Charlie Angelfield: Isabelle's older brother, who harbours an obsessive incestuous and sadistic passion for his sister.
Emmeline March: the calm, complacent twin. Generally presumed by most to be mentally retarded.
Adeline March: the angry, violent twin.
Aurelius Love: a resident of the Angelfield village, raised by Mrs. Love, he befriends Margaret. Born from twin Emmeline.
John Digence/"John-the-dig": Angelfield's longtime gardener and the Missus' companion.
The Missus: Angelfield's aged housekeeper who essentially raises the twins along with John-the-dig.
Hester Barrow: governess to Adeline and Emmeline.
Dr. Maudsley: the town doctor who, along with Hester, attempts to help the twins through experimentation.
George Angelfield: Charlie and Isabelle's father, who ignores the former and dotes on the latter after his wife's death.
Mathilde Angelfield: Charlie and Isabelle's mother, who dies giving birth to Isabelle.
Judith: Vida Winter's housekeeper.
Dr. Clifton: Vida Winter's doctor.
Mrs. Love: a woman who lived in the vicinity of Angelfield and raised Aurelius from the time he was left on her porch as an infant.
Ambrose Proctor: a boy who worked at the Angelfield estate when the twins were about 16, has a more important role in the story that we learn later.

Style
The chapters of the book switch between the past and present day life of the two main characters (Margaret Lea, Vida Winter). At the novel's inception, Lea divulges her work in her father's antique book store, her one-time jaunt as an amateur biographer, and her chance discovery at age 10 that she was born a conjoined twin, her sister dying shortly after their separation. This discovery has caused her pain and provided a reason for longing she felt, and for her strained relationship with her mother, who became depressed and withdrawn after the twin's death. After the character of Vida Winter is introduced, she narrates sections of the book, in sessions with Lea in her library. Given Winter's detailed and vivid account of her past, Lea later finds it easy to write a narrative from her notes. This becomes the biography that Winter commissioned from Lea.

The story of Winter's history is at first written in third person past tense, but at a turning point in the story, when Charlie is missing, Winter suddenly uses the pronoun "I". This is explained later in the book when Lea understands all the secrets of the March family. The remainder of the book switches between Lea in the present, who tries to fight her own ghosts and discover the secret of the March family, and the story of the Marches seen through the eyes of Winter.

The switches between Lea's character narration and Winter's story is marked by a graphic that clearly show which character is narrating that section of the chapter. It is also made more obvious by the lack of dialogue. When the narrative is about the past, dialogue is rarely shown. There is more dialogue when the story is located in the present; particularly between Lea and Aurelius.

Structure
The Thirteenth Tale is a book which shifts between two main stories. One tells of the life of amateur biographer Margaret Lea and her exploration of the Angelfield/March family's past. The other is the story which Winter tells Lea. These two intertwined stories are occasionally interrupted by letters and notes of supporting characters. The change between the different sections in this book is indicated by a small graphic or an asterisk or a new chapter.

The Thirteenth Tale is told through a first-person point of view, commonly Margaret Lea's. In this way, the reader only knows what Lea knows, and is able to solve the mystery with her. The first-person point of view also shifts to other characters, such as Vida Winter, who presents her own view through the story she tells Lea, and Hester Barrow, who presents her own view through the entries in her diary. Vida Winter originally tells her story through a third-person point of view, but then changes to first person, which causes Lea to speculate about the truthfulness of her story. This change is later explained in the book, when the idea of a cousin is introduced. Towards the end of the book it is found that Vida is half sister to the twins. Charles fathered Vida and the twins.

The Thirteenth Tale is divided into four sections: Beginnings, Middles, Endings and again Beginnings. Each section is introduced by a title page with the name of the section and a photograph which hints what will happen in that particular section of the book. The 'Beginnings' title page has a photograph of two pairs of black-buckled shoes, like the shoes the little girls wear on the cover of the book. Placed side by side, the pairs of shoes suggest similarity and bonds; they cause the reader to speculate about the theme of twins, as twins often wear matching clothing. The 'Middles' title page has a picture of a fancy doorknob on a slightly ajar door. The opening of the door represents the reader going further into the story, opening another door and proceeding and, in turn, revealing more secrets. At this point in the book the reader, with Margaret Lea, begins to unravel the mystery of Vida Winter and the Angelfield/March family. The 'Endings' title page is represented by a photograph of ripped pages of books, crumpled and folded over each other. The words on the pages indicate the pages are from Charlotte Brontë's Jane Eyre, a book which is known to have influenced some characters in the novel, such as Margaret Lea and Vida Winter. Jane Eyre provides a link among all these characters, and the ripped pages indicate the ending of all their stories.

Themes
Death

Death is explored throughout the story; from the beginning to the end. In the very beginning, in Margaret's story, Margaret's conjoined twin sister died. In Vida Winter's story, Isabelle's mother died at childbirth, leaving her father, George, depressed.  He shut himself away in his room, leaving his children to the care of servants. If Isabelle's mother had not died, perhaps the family would not have been cursed. Isabelle may have grown up normally. Charlie, the disturbed brother, may have improved his behaviour. The many deaths that occurred in The Thirteenth Tale build the story like bricks to a building. Each death determines what follows after.

The Missus interrupted George's isolation by giving him the baby Isabelle, who woke him to life again.  He became overly attached to his daughter, denied her nothing and asked little of her. Isabelle was raised without order or routine. She would get food whenever she was hungry and grew up to become an unstable girl. When she told him she was going to leave to marry Roland, he attacked Isabelle, and died from septicaemia because he wound a piece of her hair around his finger. The next death was Isabelle's, years later. She died from the flu in a mental institution.  Her brother Charlie, who loved her, died next.  He followed in his father's footsteps by locking himself in his room. He left to go to a place where he used to go with Isabelle and shot himself.

Leaving the family without a legal owner and financial manager of Angelfield, the Missus and John-the-dig were left to manage the family themselves. The Missus died of a combination of old age and shock after part of the building collapsed, and John-the-dig died in a fall from a ladder, as he was trying to care for the deteriorating mansion. Adeline fiddled with the safety hatch when he was on the ladder.

Adeline is purported to have died in the Angelfield house fire. Emmeline died near the end at an old age, and Vida Winter let the 'wolf' inside of her win when she finished telling her story.

The theme of death is mentioned by Margaret as something essential to a good book; that is, an old novel. "I read old novels. The reason is simple: I prefer proper endings. Marriages and death..."part One, Beginnings.

Identity

This is the main theme of the book, with the key character Margaret feels like half a person; she discovers that her twin has died and she learns she was conjoined from the scar on her side confirmed by her father.  Throughout the book, her character struggles with the feeling that something is outside of her that was once a part of her, and that because that part no longer lives, she can’t be a whole person.

Loss

This is also a recurring theme in the book that is closely linked to identity, as it was the loss of Margaret’s twin that first led her to question her identity and who she was. Loss recurs in Vida Winter's story of the twins, with Isabelle departing for a mental asylum, Charlie committing suicide, Hester Barrow disappearing, and John-the-dig and Missus dying. Finally, at the end of the book, Vida Winter, known as the ghost of Angelfield House, loses her most beloved person, the twin thought to be Emmeline her half sister.

Reconciliation

Is a theme that was present in the last part of the book, when Margaret meets her missing half, her twin, and feels complete.  Vida Winter was also re-united with her half sister in death at the end of the book.

Jane Eyre

Jane Eyre is frequently mentioned in the novel.  Lea speculates about the connections between that novel and the lives of the Marches. Hester, like Jane was a governess at a manor, employed by a wealthy master. Hester, like Jane, is the dominant female. But unlike Jane, Hester does not fall in love with the master of the house- Charlie. Charlie was not Edward Rochester and had never in the book met Hester.
"Charlie was less directly influenced. He kept out of her way and that suited both of them. She had no desire to do anything but her job, and her job was us. Our minds, our bodies, and our souls, yes, but our guardian was outside her jurisdiction, and so she left him alone. She was no Jane Eyre and he was no Mr Rochester." — p. 175

Jane Eyre is the first title to creep into the book, and once having found its place, never left. Only when the girl in the mist comes to be, is the connection between Miss Winter's story and that of Jane's- the outsider in the family.
Jane Eyre moves from the beginning as a book that is often discussed, to an important part of the story; the inner furniture of Margaret's and Miss Winter's minds. Most conversations between Vida Winter and Margaret centre-point Jane Eyre. Miss Winter's example with the burning books focuses Jane Eyre as the "only hope" and the last one to burn.  Aurelius is found with a torn page from Jane Eyre. The significance of the book in the novel is vital and is a leitmotif; often recurring. It is obvious that Diane Setterfield is paying homage to Jane Eyre and its sisterhood of novels.

Isolation

Isolation: From the start of the novel, we know that Margaret is an isolated child. She has "no siblings" and her relationship with her mother isn't a strong and loving one. Margaret's retreat from the world would have left her feeling unbearably isolated if she did not have the indirect human contact made through reading. And it is reading that is able to make her withdraw into herself as she does yet it also brings her back out. Reading "Thirteen Tales of Change and Desperation" takes her to Miss Winter and then to Aurelius. Her isolation found in reading, enables her to have a more open relationship with her father and contemplating changes of an even greater kind.
Isabelle, as a young baby, was at first neglected by her father. Living in Angelfield, both Charlie and Isabelle did not have much contact with the outside world.
Emmeline and Adeline were also ignored at their birth. While their mother was at an asylum and their uncle locked up in his room, the twins were isolated to a point. From that, they were able to become the people they were- detached from everyone but each other. Isolation does many things to a person. Charlie, Isabelle, Emmeline, Adeline and Angelfield are not normal.

Twins

In the mythologies of many cultures around the world, twins make frequent appearances. They appear both fortuitous in some and ominous in others. Twins in mythology are often cast as two-halves of the same whole, sharing a bond deeper than those of other ordinary siblings, or facing fierce rivalry. Sometimes twins can represent some "other" aspect of the "self"- either a doppelganger or a shadow. Often in mythology the twin is evil, or the other one may be human and the other is semi-divine.

In cases where the "evil twin" is not physically distinguishable from the "good twin", a typical plot resolution will involve the banishment and unmasking of the "evil twin".

In the modern usage, the words "evil twin" and "doppelganger", have come to be virtually interchangeable. While the evil twin does not connote the sense of "supernatural harbinger of death", it can be used to mean "a physical copy of one's self that has an altered morality".

The supernatural aspects of the book often recur and the sightings of doppelgangers tense up the air.
When Hester thinks she sees Adeline and Emmeline playing in the woods, she later says she must have seen a ghost. A doppelganger.

The bond shared by Adeline and Emmeline is one of deep meaning. Only the two together, can you create a whole and the absence of one can cause great physical and emotional trauma. When Hester and Dr Maudsley experiment with original case study research, the separation of the twins is painful for all to see. It greatly affected the mental abilities of each twin. The heartfelt pain of losing not just a sibling, but a twin, the one who shared a bond deeper than any other.
"She was lost, absent from herself. Without her sister, she was nothing and she was no one. It was just the shell of a person they took to the doctor's house." — p. 205.

The separation also proved painful, it was no ordinary separation and each twin would have rather died than live on without the other. To them, there was just no point in living any more.
"The separation of the twins was no ordinary separation. Imagine surviving an earthquake. When you come to, you find the world unrecognisable. The horizon is in a different place. The sun has changed colour. Nothing remains of the terrain you know. As for you, you are alive. But it's not the same as living. It's no wonder the survivors of such disasters so often wish they had perished with others. " — p. 206

Reception
One week after publication, the novel became No. 1 on The New York Times Best Seller list in 2006.
Reviews include the following:

Kirkus Reviews – "a contemporary Gothic tale whose excesses and occasional implausibility can be forgiven for the thrill of the storytelling. Setterfield's debut is enchanting Goth for the 21st century."
 Library Journal – "It's a gothic novel, and it doesn't pretend to be anything fancier. But this one grabs the reader with its damp, icy fingers and doesn't let go until the last shocking secret has been revealed."
 The Washington Post – "The Thirteenth Tale keeps us reading for its nimble cadences and atmospheric locales, as well as for its puzzles, the pieces of which, for the most part, fall into place just as we discover where the holes are. And yet, for all its success – and perhaps because of them – on the whole the book feels unadventurous, content to rehash literacy formulas rather than reimagining them."

AudioFile magazine wrote of the audiobook recording, "Bianca Amato is stunning as Margaret ... Amato's respect for the power of story and the written word is heard in every utterance. Jill Tanner accomplishes a tour de force as the enigmatic and mysterious Vida ... her voice takes on the strength and power of a master storyteller as she weaves her spellbinding life story."

References

English Gothic novels
2006 British novels
British novels adapted into films
British novels adapted into television shows
2006 debut novels
Atria Publishing Group books